Propaganda Man is an album by Ray Wilson released in 2008.

Track listing

Personnel
 Ray Wilson - Vocals, Guitar, and Mouth Organ
 Ali Ferguson - Lead Guitar and Backing Vocals
 Lawrie MacMillan - Bass and Backing Vocals
 Ashley MacMillan - Drums and Percussion

Additional personnel
 Graeme Hughes - Guitar on "Things Don't Stop"
 Scott Spence - Additional Guitar on "Bless Me", "Progaganda Man", and "Cosmic Baby" - Guitar on "Modern Day Miracle"
 Kim McLelland - Piano on "Razorlite" and Organ on "Modern Day Miracle", "The Brakes Are Gone", "Propaganda Man", and "Frequency"
 David Archibald - Piano on "The Brakes Are Gone" and "Frequency"
 Gregor Lowrey - Accordion on "Modern Day Miracle" and "The Brakes Are Gone"
 Tesiree Priti Kaitesi - Vocals on "Bless Me" and "Propaganda Man"
 Alvin Mills - Bass on "Bless Me"
 Uwe Metzler - Guitar on "Bless Me"
 Nir Z - Drums on "Bless Me"

Production
 Album produced by Ray Wilson
 "Things Don't Stop" produced by Graeme Hughes
 "Bless Me" produced by Peter Hoff
 Additional production on "Propaganda Man" by Scott Spence
 Album mixed and engineered by Graeme Hughes
 Album mastering by Uncle Jack
 "More Propaganda" and "On the Other Side" recorded at MM Studio, Poznań Poland by Przemyslaw Sluzynski

2008 albums
Ray Wilson (musician) albums